The 4 arrondissements of the Somme department are:
 Arrondissement of Abbeville, (subprefecture: Abbeville) with 164 communes.  The population of the arrondissement was 125,867 in 2016.
 Arrondissement of Amiens, (prefecture of the Somme department: Amiens) with 291 communes. The population of the arrondissement was 304,282 in 2016.
 Arrondissement of Montdidier, (subprefecture: Montdidier) with 109 communes. The population of the arrondissement was 47,700 in 2016.
 Arrondissement of Péronne, (subprefecture: Péronne) with 208 communes. The population of the arrondissement was 94,895 in 2016.

History

In 1800 the arrondissements of Amiens, Abbeville, Doullens, Montdidier and Péronne were established. The arrondissement of Doullens was disbanded in 1926. In January 2009 the canton of Oisemont passed from the arrondissement of Amiens to the arrondissement of Abbeville. 

The borders of the arrondissements of Somme were modified in January 2017:
 38 communes from the arrondissement of Abbeville to the arrondissement of Amiens
 two communes from the arrondissement of Amiens to the arrondissement of Abbeville
 five communes from the arrondissement of Amiens to the arrondissement of Montdidier
 28 communes from the arrondissement of Amiens to the arrondissement of Péronne
 26 communes from the arrondissement of Montdidier to the arrondissement of Péronne
 seven communes from the arrondissement of Péronne to the arrondissement of Amiens

References

Somme